North Branch Sugar River  flows into the Sugar River west of Constableville, New York.

References 

Rivers of New York (state)
Rivers of Lewis County, New York